Roccabella is a condominium complex in Montreal, Quebec, Canada, located next to the Bell Centre in downtown Montreal, at Mountain Street and René-Lévesque Blvd.

The project consists of two 40-floor towers containing 552 condominium units.
 Drummond Tower
 De la Montagne Tower 

Construction began in 2013 and was completed in early 2016 for the first tower. Construction of the second tower began in late 2016.

References

External links
Official website - Le Roccabella

Skyscrapers in Montreal
Residential skyscrapers in Canada
Residential condominiums in Canada
Downtown Montreal
Twin towers